Mountain Park is an unincorporated community in Otero County, New Mexico, United States. It is located at 32.951°N, 105.824°W, and its elevation is 6710 feet.

It is the birthplace of Bill Mauldin, an American editorial cartoonist
and two-time winner of the Pulitzer Prize.

Education
It is zoned to Alamogordo Public Schools. High Rolls/Mount Park Elementary is the zoned elementary school, while Chaparral Middle School is the zoned middle school. Alamogordo High School is the district's comprehensive high school.

References

Unincorporated communities in New Mexico
Unincorporated communities in Otero County, New Mexico